Khargapur railway station is located in Tikamgarh district of Madhya Pradesh and serves Khargapur town. Its code is "KHGP". Passenger, Express, and Superfast trains halt here.

Trains

The following trains halt at Khargapur railway station in both directions:

 Dr. Ambedkar Nagar - Prayagraj Express
 Bhopal - Khajuraho Mahamana Superfast Express
 Khajuraho - Jhansi Passenger

References

Railway stations in Tikamgarh district
Jhansi railway division